She Married Her Boss is a 1935 American comedy film directed by Gregory La Cava and starring Claudette Colbert.

Plot
Julia Scott (Claudette Colbert) is a very efficient secretary at a department store. She is in love with her boss, Richard Barclay (Melvyn Douglas), who pays no attention to her, unless it has to do with business. Julia goes to lunch with Martha Pryor (Jean Dixon), who tells her she is offered a manager position of a department store in Paris. She turns it down, because of her love for Richard. Business forces Julia and Richard to work late at his house. Julia meets Richard's sister, Gertrude, and his daughter, Annabel, who is a very spoiled, out of control child. Richard lets Julia take over the house for a couple of hours, in which she "straightens out" the household. Afterwards, she regrets all that she did at Richard's house. She turns to Martha, who says she'll take care of everything. Martha talks to Richard the next day, telling him that Julia is leaving and taking the job in Paris. Richard is very upset, and wants to know why. She struggles to come up with excuses, and they take the afternoon off, during which Richard and Julia are married. When Julia insists on being carried over the thresh-hold of his home. Gertrude is not happy, and insists the marriage will not last.

The next day, Julia decides to stay home and attend to business there. The office is a complete disaster that day, in complete chaos. Meanwhile, Annabel has refused to eat anything while Julia is in the house, but Julia continues to outsmart and "befriends her, along with Rodgers, a prospective business partner. Gertrude continues to try and ruin the marriage. While Julia and Rodgers are working, Annabel enters, and they all start singing. Richard comes home and is very upset with Julia. He would rather have her helping him get the business deal with Rodgers. Julia decides to go down to Philadelphia and "get the Rodgers place in order." But after a while Annabelle wants Julia to come home, so Richard decides to go down to Philadelphia and bring his wife back. The night before he arrives, Julia and Rodgers drink heavily and spend the night in the store front window singing. Richard sees photos of the incident in the newspaper, and storms out of Julia's hotel room after she insists he cares more about the store than about her.

Julia feels the marriage is over, and makes plans for a cruise to Cuba and Panama with Rodgers. As she stops by home to pick up her things, Annabel begs her to stay. Richard, usually a teetotaller, has been getting drunk with his butler. When he finds out Julia is in the house, he confronts her drunkenly, then pretends to have a gun in his pocket and forces her into a car being driven by the intoxicated butler. The car careens through the city to a brickyard, where Richard picks up bricks, and then returns to the store. Both he and Julia throw bricks through the store window, laughing. As the police chase them, they rush to the pier, with the goal of departing on the cruise to Cuba together.

Cast
 Claudette Colbert as Julia Scott
 Melvyn Douglas as Richard Barclay
 Michael Bartlett as Lennie Rogers
 Raymond Walburn as Franklin
 Jean Dixon as Martha Pryor
 Katharine Alexander as Gertrude Barclay
 Edith Fellows as Annabel Barclay
 Clara Kimball Young as Parsons
 Grace Hayle as Agnes Mayo (as Grace Hale) 
 Charles Arnt as Victor Jessup

See also
 List of American films of 1935

External links
 
 
 
 

1930s American films
1935 films
1935 romantic comedy films
American romantic comedy films
American screwball comedy films
American black-and-white films
Columbia Pictures films
Films directed by Gregory La Cava
Films with screenplays by Sidney Buchman